Blagoja "Bobi" Milevski (born 25 March 1971) is a Macedonian football manager and former player who is coaching the North Macedonia national football team.

Playing career

Club
During his playing career he played with Red Star Belgrade, Iraklis, Trikala, Maribor, Pobeda, Paniliakos, Makedonija GjP, Ashdod, Cementarnica 55 and Vardar.

International
He played one match for the Macedonian national team in September 1998 against Egypt.

Managerial career
After retiring, he became a coach.  While coaching Vardar, he won the award attributed by the Football Federation of Macedonia as the best coach in 2013. On 18 September 2014, he was named coach of the Macedonian U21 team.
On 11 May 2018 Milevski was signed to the Israeli Premier League club, F.C. Ashdod.

Honours and awards
As player:
NK Maribor
Slovenian League:
Runner-up: 1994–95
Slovenian Cup: 
Winner: 1993–94
FK Pobeda
Macedonian First League:
Runner-up: 1996–97
F.C. Ashdod
Toto Cup:
Runner-up: 2001-02
FK Cementarnica 55
Macedonian Second League:
Runner-up: 2006–07
FK Makedonija GjP
Macedonian First League:
Winner: 2008–09
Macedonian Cup:
Runner-up: 2008–09

As coach:
FK Vardar
Macedonian First League: 
Winner: 2012–13
Macedonian Super Cup:
Winner: 2013

See also
NK Maribor players

References

External links
 
 

1971 births
Living people
Association football central defenders
Yugoslav footballers
Macedonian footballers
North Macedonia international footballers
Red Star Belgrade footballers
Iraklis Thessaloniki F.C. players
Trikala F.C. players
NK Maribor players
FK Pobeda players
Paniliakos F.C. players
FK Makedonija Gjorče Petrov players
F.C. Ashdod players
FK Cementarnica 55 players
FK Vardar players
Slovenian PrvaLiga players
Macedonian First Football League players
Super League Greece players
Israeli Premier League players
Macedonian Second Football League players
Macedonian expatriate footballers
Expatriate footballers in Greece
Macedonian expatriate sportspeople in Greece
Expatriate footballers in Slovenia
Macedonian expatriate sportspeople in Slovenia
Expatriate footballers in Israel
Macedonian expatriate sportspeople in Israel
Macedonian football managers
FK Vardar managers
North Macedonia national under-21 football team managers
F.C. Ashdod managers
Macedonian expatriate football managers
Expatriate football managers in Israel
Footballers from Skopje